Celebrity Big Brother: After Dark (often shortened to CBBAD) is a spinoff of the American reality series Celebrity Big Brother, and is the Celebrity version of Big Brother: After Dark. It premiered on the U.S. cable channel Pop. The series began on February 7, 2018. Celebrity Big Brother: After Dark was announced on January 26, 2018 and has received its own title card and promotional videos. Throughout its first season a total of 18 episodes aired. The first season concluded on February 24, 2018. The series was renewed for a second season on December 26, 2018. The second season consisted of 21 episodes and ran from January 23 to February 13, 2019.

Broadcast and features
New episodes began airing 12:00 AM Eastern Time with the exceptions of Tuesdays when it started at 11:00 PM and Fridays when it began at 1:00 AM. The episodes aired nightly in the United States on Pop and on Slice in Canada until 3:00 AM EST. The series follows the same format as Big Brother: After Dark which features live footage from inside the house. The show uses the same live feed footage available to 24/7 Internet subscribers, though the show's producers choose the camera angles and scenes within the program. For the second season new episodes air from 12:00–3:00 AM EST nightly beginning on January 23, 2019 for the duration of Celebrity Big Brother 2

Series overview

Episodes

Season 1 (2018)

Season 2 (2019)

References

External links

2010s American reality television series
2018 American television series debuts
2019 American television series endings
American television spin-offs
Big Brother (American TV series)
English-language television shows
Reality television spin-offs
Pop (American TV channel) original programming